The Port Moresby Power Station is a gas-fired power plant in Kairuku-Hiri District, Central Province, Papua New Guinea.

History
The power plant was constructed by Wärtsilä with a cost of US$100 million. The construction started in August 2017 and was inaugurated by Prime Minister James Marape on 6 December 2019.

Generation units
The power plant has six generation units with a total installed capacity of 58 MW.

References

2019 establishments in Papua New Guinea
Energy infrastructure completed in 2019
Natural gas-fired power stations in Oceania
Power stations in Papua New Guinea